The Pierre du Moëllé (el. 1661 m.) is a high mountain pass in the Swiss Alps, connecting Leysin to the lake of Hongrin in the canton of Vaud. The pass lies between the Tour de Famelon and the Gros Van.

References

External links 
Pierre du Moëllé on Hikr

Mountain passes of the Alps
Mountain passes of Switzerland
Mountain passes of the canton of Vaud